Hannu-Pekka Juhani Björkman (born 11 February 1969 in Kannonkoski) is a Finnish actor who has appeared in theatres, on television and in films. In 2005, he won a Jussi Award for the best actor in a leading role for a film Eläville ja kuolleille. Björkman was married to actress Minna Haapkylä from 2002 to 2014. They have two sons.

Selected filmography

Lakeuden kutsu (2000)
Eila (2003)
Pahat pojat (2003)
Lapsia ja aikuisia (2004)
Eläville ja kuolleille (2005)
FC Venus (2005)
Joulutarina (2007)
Raja 1918 (2007)
Blackout (2008)
Niko – lentäjän poika (2008)
Haarautuvan rakkauden talo (2009)
Kuulustelu (2009)
Kohta 18 (2012)
Armi elää! (2015)
The Eternal Road (2017)
The Renovation (2020)

References

External links

1969 births
Living people
People from Kannonkoski
21st-century Finnish male actors